The following page lists power stations in Belgium.

Operational Power Plants

Fossil

Hydroelectric

Solar 

Most solar power in Belgium is residential but there are some large solar industrial solar power plants as well:

Nuclear

Wind

Wind Offshore

Onshore Wind

Flemish Region Onshore Wind 

sources:

Walloon Region Onshore Wind 

sources:

Decommissioned Power Plants

See also 

 List of power stations in Europe
 List of largest power stations in the world

References 

Belgium
 
Lists of buildings and structures in Belgium